Kavyalankara ("The ornaments of poetry") is the name of two works in Sanskrit poetics (see the author's articles for details on the works):
 Kāvyālaṅkāra by Bhamaha (c. 7th century), roughly contemporaneous with Daṇḍin
 Kāvyālaṅkāra by Rudrata, a Kashmirian poet of c. 9th century